"Beg, Steal or Borrow" is a 1972 song by The New Seekers.

Beg, Steal or Borrow or Beg, Borrow and Steal may also refer to:

Music
 "Beg, Steal or Borrow" (Ray LaMontagne song), 2010 
 "Beg, Steal or Borrow", a song by Berlin from the 1984 album Love Life
 "Beg, Borrow and Steal", a 1962 song by Vernon Harrell
 "Beg, Borrow and Steal" a 1967 song by Ohio Express
 Beg, Borrow and Steal, a 2010 album by Cookies 'N' Beans
 Beg, Borrow, and Steal, an unreleased album by Neon Hitch
 Beg, Borrow, Steal, a 2004 album by Army of Freshmen
 "Beg, Borrow or Steal", a song by Hughes/Thrall from the 1982 album Hughes/Thrall
 "Beg, Borrow, or Steal", a 1965 song by The Gentlemen
 Beg, Borrow or Steal (musical), 1960
 "You see, I begged, stole, and I borrowed...", a line from the song "Easy" by the Commodores.

Other uses
 Beg, Borrow or Steal, a 1937 American comedy film 
 Beg, Borrow, Steal, a 2009 memoir by Michael Greenberg

See also
 BB Steal (Beg Borrow Steal), an Australian Rock band
 Begborrowsteel, a 2005 EP by Count Bass D
 Beg & Borrow'', a 2015 album by Battlefield Band